Lasse Juhani Näsi (12 October 1930 – 22 February 2022) was a Finnish politician. A member of the Centre Party, he served in the Parliament of Finland from 1991 to 1995. He died on 22 February 2022, at the age of 91.

References

1930 births
2022 deaths
20th-century Finnish politicians
People from Tornio
Mayors of places in Finland
Members of the Parliament of Finland (1991–95)
Centre Party (Finland) politicians